D523 is a state road connecting D501 state road and D8 / D102 state roads. The road is only 2.9 km long.

The road, as well as all other state roads in Croatia, is managed and maintained by Hrvatske ceste, state owned company.

Road junctions and populated areas

Sources

State roads in Croatia
Transport in Primorje-Gorski Kotar County